Victor Lelup (13 March 1924 - 22 February 2006) was a Belgian professional motocross rider, winner of the first Motocross World Championship in 1952 in the main class (at that time the 500cc).

References

External links
 
 Victor Leloup at Connaître la Wallonie

1924 births
2006 deaths
Sportspeople from Liège
Walloon sportspeople
Belgian motocross riders